Colin Oates (born 7 June 1983 in  Harold Wood, London) is an English former Judoka.

Judo career
In 2011, Oates won a bronze medal in the 2011 European Championship defeating Pierre Duprat from France and finished fifth in the 2011 World Championship, losing to Musa Mogushkov from Russia in the bronze medal match. Securing qualification to his first Olympic Games in London.

Oates competed for Team GB in the 2012 London Olympics in the men's 66 kg judo event. After victories over Australia's Ivo dos Santos and former World Champion Khashbaataryn Tsagaanbaatar Oates was beaten in the quarter finals by the eventual gold medallist, Lasha Shavdatuashvili from Georgia, being pinned for 15 seconds during "golden score" overtime.  He lost again in the repêchage to Cho Jun-Ho of South Korea, who went on to win the bronze medal.

Colin became Commonwealth Champion in Glasgow (2014) at under 66 kg defeating Andreas Krassas in the final and two years later in 2016, he won a silver medal at the European Championships in Russia. After London Colin went on to add to his Grand Slam and Grand Prix medals including a Gold in the Baku Grand Slam in 2014 followed by a Silver the following year.

Between 2012 and 2016 he was ranked in the top 15 of the world, spending most of that period in the top ten of the world and qualified for his second Olympics in Rio 2016, where he went out in the round of 32. His final major tournament successes came in 2016 and 2017. Competing two weight groups higher than his usual fighting weight, at under 81 kilograms, Colin took gold in both the 2016 British Judo Championships and the English Senior Open. The 2016 victory was the fifth time that he was crowned champion of Great Britain, having previously won the British Judo Championships in 2007, 2012, 2013 and 2014.

Author
Colin has co-authored two judo books with his father Howard Oates. 
 Colin Oates Judo, Getting Started .
 Colin Oates Judo: Groundwork .

In 2021, Pitch Publishing released a biography (written by father, Howard) about Colin and his rise to glory entitled 'Accidental Olympian: Colin Oates, a Judo journey'.

Personal life
Colin has a brother, David Oates, who is a writer and illustrator of children's books.

References

External links
 
 
 

1983 births
Living people
English male judoka
Judoka at the 2012 Summer Olympics
Judoka at the 2016 Summer Olympics
Olympic judoka of Great Britain
Sportspeople from London
People from Harold Wood
Commonwealth Games medallists in judo
Commonwealth Games gold medallists for England
Judoka at the 2014 Commonwealth Games
European Games competitors for Great Britain
Judoka at the 2015 European Games
Medallists at the 2014 Commonwealth Games